"Lacrymosa" is a song recorded by American rock band Evanescence for their second studio album, The Open Door (2006). An alternative version appears on the band's fourth studio album Synthesis (2017). The song was composed by singer and pianist Amy Lee and guitarist Terry Balsamo, with production by Dave Fortman and choral arrangements by Lee.

"Lacrymosa" incorporates the Lacrimosa sequence from Mozart's Requiem (1791), which was originally performed in the key of D-minor and Lee and Balsamo transposed into E minor. A David Campbell–led orchestra and a choir support the song, alongside Lee's piano and the band's guitar, bass and drums. The song contains elements of several genres, including alternative metal and gothic rock. "Lacrymosa" garnered generally positive reviews from music critics, who praised Lee's vocals and arrangement and deemed it one of the most memorable songs on The Open Door.

Background and recording 

"Lacrymosa" was written by Amy Lee and Terry Balsamo and produced by Dave Fortman. David Campbell, who has previously arranged music for the band and worked with them at the Billboard Music Awards, led a 22-piece orchestra for the song. The Millennium Choir performed the Lacrimosa sequence ("Lacrimosa dies illa Qua resurget ex favilla Judicandus homo reus. Huic ergo parce, Deus: Pie Jesu Domine, Dona eis requiem. Amen.") and backing vocals throughout the song. Lee, the orchestra and choir recorded the song at a chapel in Seattle, Washington. In a number of interviews, Lee revealed that everyone asked about a collaboration between her and Mozart. She further stated that she always wanted to make Lacrimosa from Mozart's Requiem a metal song, later adding that The Open Door was "the time for that, for trying things I hadn't been brave enough to try before." In an interview with VH1 News, Lee further explained the inspiration behind the song
I saw Amadeus when I was nine years old and fell in love with Mozart. The part of Mozart's Requiem called "Lacyrmosa"  is my favorite piece of music ever. I always wished we could cover it, but with programming and guitars and make it cool. It's our moment to try all the things I wanted to and couldn't, so I started messing with it in Protools. Terry wrote some riffs and turned it into this awesome metal epic.

In a 2004 interview, Lee said she was working on music for The Chronicles of Narnia: The Lion, the Witch and the Wardrobe, but that the music was rejected by the studio for being "too dark". She said "Lacrymosa" was one of the songs originally written for the film. The producers of Narnia then stated that Evanescence music was never planned for the soundtrack.

Composition, music and lyrics 

According to the sheet music published by Alfred Publishing on Musicnotes.com, "Lacrymosa" is an alternative metal, gothic rock and post-grunge song set in a common time and performed in slow tempo of 48 beats per minute. Although the original Lacrimosa sequence was performed in D-minor, it was transposed into E-minor by Lee and Terry Balsamo. The instrumentation in the song is provided by piano, guitar, violins and drums. Lee's vocal range from the low note of B3 to the high note of E5; the SATB choir vocals range from the low note of B2 to the high note of E4. In 2017, Evanescence revisited Lacrymosa with an full symphony orchestral version with an electronic background for the 4th studio album, Synthesis. Lee went on to leaving out the choir and did all the operatic vocals herself in both backing and front vocal. According to Gauntlet writer Claire Colette, "Lacrymosa" has a "violin intro, synth worth of a Nine Inch Nails album, and Omen-esque choral sections that are very haunting." It then goes on with a pinon-themed melody before the "power guitar section" joins in. Lyrically, the song speaks about a break-up, as illustrated in the verse "And you can blame it on me / Just set your guilt free, honey / I don't want to hold you back now love".

Rob Sheffield from Rolling Stone said that "Lacrymosa" features Lee "sobbing hysterically over a grand piano". According to the IGN reviewer, Ed Thompson, the song "takes the trademark Evanescence sound - Lee's celestial voice, and adds her brooding lyrics 'I can't change who I am, not this time, I won't lie to keep you near me and in this short life, there's no time to waste on giving up. My love wasn't enough'.". Danielle Baudhuin from The Oshkosh West Index noted that "Lacrymosa" was musically similar to "Haunted" from the band's debut studio album Fallen, noting how "creepy background choir vocals and violins send listeners into a gothic Cathedral-like setting". Jim Farber from the Daily News said that "Lacrymosa" will remind older listeners of the 1970s art rock horror band Renaissance. Andree Farias from Christianity Today observed that the song had no connection with the movie Narnia whatsoever classifying it as "just another bitter break-up anthem".

Lacrymosa is a corruption of the Latin term lacrimosa, which means "tearful". The track title is also the scientific name for a species of moth known as Catocala lacrymosa, also known as the "tearful underwing". The species of moth are featured throughout The Open Doors cover booklet and on the cover of the "Sweet Sacrifice" radio promotional CD. A clip of "Lacrymosa" was used in the video teaser for The Open Door.

Critical reception 

"Lacrymosa" received generally positive reviews from music critics. Ed Thompson from IGN called "Lacrymosa" the "most memorable track" in the whole album. Don Kaye of the website Blabbermouth.net said that while the song was an "interesting experiment" it came "across as more of a stab at artsiness with its strings and choirs than a real song." Danielle Baudhuin from The Oshkosh West Index stated that "Lacrymosa" is one of the songs on the album where Lee's "astounding classical vocals are displayed". An editor from The New York Times said that "Lacrymosa" is grandiose "even by the album's standards". Sputnikmusic said that the song is the best on the album and gave it a grade of 4.5 along with "Good Enough", adding that on the last two songs the album stops to be boring because of the musical variation. On Postmedia News it was stated that Lee "achieves stunning notes on 'Lacrymosa', which employs a haunting choir". Jordan Reimer from The Daily Princetonian praised Lee's melodies and said that "Cloud Nine" and "Lacrymosa" were her best two arrangements. John Hood from the Miami New Times made a story, "'Call Me When You're Sober' sent a man away, 'Lacrymosa' kept him there, and 'Cloud Nine' told the clueless dolt why he would no longer ever be welcomed back. A writer of The Independent put the song on his list of "Download This" from The Open Door.

Brendan Butler from Cinema Blend was critical saying that "the worst song on The Open Door, i[t’]s a toss up between 'Lacrymosa' with its abominable choir and the obnoxious 'Lose Control,' which features Amy crying for about five minutes." Glenn Gamboa from The Providence Journal concluded that "maybe the over-the-top dramatics of 'Lacrymosa' and piano ballad 'Your Star' will be seen as so-bad-they’re-good."

Live performances 
The song was played live by the band during their tour for the promotion of The Open Door. On the concert which took place on November 17, 2007, in Orem the band played "Lacrymosa". During the performance Lee was wearing a purple tank, black skirt and black boots. They also performed the song at Hammerstein Ballroom in New York in 2006. Evanescence played the song live at their secret New York City gig which took place on November 4, 2009. The band played the song during a concert in Porto Alegre, Brazil, on October 4, 2012.

Credits and personnel 
Credits adapted from The Open Door liner notes.

 Songwriting – Amy Lee, Terry Balsamo
 Vocals, keyboards, choral arrangements, additional programming – Amy Lee
 Guitar – Terry Balsamo
 Guitar – John LeCompt
 Bass guitar – Will Boyd
 Drums – Rocky Gray

 Choir performance – Millennium Choir: Susan Youngblood, Talaya Trigueros, Mary Gaffney, Alyssa Campbell, Bebe Gordon, Melanie Bruno, Dwight Stone, Eric Castro, Darryl Phinnessee, Tamara Berard, Kevin Dalbey, Marcella Carmona, Tania Themmen, Joanne Paratore, Lisa Wall-Urgero
 Strings – Seattlemusic
 Programming – DJ Lethal
 Production, mixing – Dave Fortman
 Engineering – Jeremy Parker
 Mastering – Ted Jensen

References

External links 

 Evanescence.com

Evanescence songs
2006 songs
Songs written by Amy Lee
Songs written by Terry Balsamo
Wolfgang Amadeus Mozart